Mohd Fadhli bin Mohd Shas (born 21 January 1991) is a Malaysian professional footballer who plays as a defender for Malaysia Super League club Sri Pahang, on loan from Johor Darul Ta'zim.

Fadhli was born in Lumut in Manjung District situated about 84 km from Ipoh, the capital city of Perak. At his youth, his family moved to Johor.

Fadhli, alongside Irfan Fazail, is the first Malaysian to play in the Slovak League with Zlaté Moravce.

Club career

Zlaté Moravce
In September 2011, Fadhli had played for the Slovakian club, Zlaté Moravce for a 3-month loan from Harimau Muda A. Fadhli made his debut with the team in a 3–0 win against Spartak Myjava, coming on the 82nd minute replacing Martin Babic.

Fadhli returned to Harimau Muda A shortly after his national duty in the 2011 SEA Games. In total, Fadhli managed to make only 1 official appearance for Zlaté Moravce. In early 2012, popular website for football news, Goal.com has named Fadhli in Asian Under-23 Best XI for the year 2011.

Johor Darul Ta'zim
On 15 February 2014, Fadhli scored his first goal for Johor Darul Ta'zim in a league match against Selangor.

International career
In November 2010, Fadhli was called up to the Malaysia national squad by coach K. Rajagopal for the 2010 AFF Suzuki Cup. Malaysia won the 2010 AFF Suzuki Cup title for the first time in their history. Fadhli also played in the 2012 AFF Suzuki Cup in which he was the first choice centre back. He was the first choice pair with Mohd Aidil Zafuan Abdul Radzak as the centre back. However, he was sent off during the match against Thailand in the semi final AFF Suzuki Cup 2012.

Statistics

Club

International

Honours
Johor Darul Ta'zim
 Malaysian Charity Shield(4): 2015, 2016, 2018, 2020
 Malaysia Super League (7): 2014, 2015, 2016, 2017, 2018, 2019, 2020
 Malaysia FA Cup (1): 2016
 Malaysia Cup(2): 2017, 2019
 2015 AFC Cup(1): 2015

Harimau Muda
 Malaysia Premier League: 2009

International
 Southeast Asian Games: 2011
 AFF Suzuki Cup: 2010 ;Runner-up 2014

Individuals
Goal.com Asian Under-23 Best XI for 2011

References

External links
 Biography: Mohd Fadhli Mohd Shas

1991 births
Living people
Malaysian people of Malay descent
People from Perak
Malaysian footballers
Malaysia international footballers
Malaysian expatriate footballers
Malaysian expatriate sportspeople in Slovakia
Expatriate footballers in Slovakia
FC ViOn Zlaté Moravce players
Johor Darul Ta'zim F.C. players
Malaysia Super League players
Association football central defenders
Footballers at the 2010 Asian Games
Footballers at the 2014 Asian Games
Southeast Asian Games gold medalists for Malaysia
Southeast Asian Games medalists in football
Competitors at the 2011 Southeast Asian Games
Asian Games competitors for Malaysia